Noguchi Dam  is a gravity dam located in Kagawa Prefecture in Japan. The dam is used for flood control and irrigation. The catchment area of the dam is 12.2 km2. The dam impounds about 10  ha of land when full and can store 1150 thousand cubic meters of water. The construction of the dam was completed in 1966.

See also
List of dams in Japan

References

Dams in Kagawa Prefecture